The 1981 Oregon State Beavers football team represented Oregon State University in the Pacific-10 Conference (Pac-10) during the 1981 NCAA Division I-A football season.  In their second season under head coach Joe Avezzano, the Beavers compiled a 1–10 record (0–7 against Pac-10 opponents), finished in last place in the Pac-10, and were outscored by their opponents, 469 to 145.  The team played its home games at Parker Stadium in Corvallis, Oregon.

Schedule

Roster
DT Tracy Abernathy
LB Jerome Boyd, Jr.
OT Joe Carnahan
WR Armand Chong
OG Pete Grossnicklaus #69
OG Jim Wilson #59
LB J.J. Gracio
Terry Harris
DT Tyrone Howard #73
WR Ken Lawson, Fr.
C Roger Levasa, Sr.
PK Chris Mangold
DE Craig Sowash #17 (defense)
WR Victor Simmons, Sr.
QB Ed Singler
CB Kenny Taylor #30

Season summary

Fresno State
Victor Simmons 6 Rec, 155 Yds, TD

References

Oregon State
Oregon State Beavers football seasons
Oregon State Beavers football